Supaul College of Engineering (Supaul Bihar 852131 सुपौल अभियंत्रण महाविद्यालय) is a government technical institution under Department of Science and Technology, Bihar.  The College is affiliated to Aryabhatta Knowledge University. It was established in 2017 at Supaul, Bihar.

Admission
From 2022 onwards, admissions will be based on  Joint Entrance Examination – Main Or BCECE exam  merit list. Students who want to enroll must appear in Joint Entrance Examination – Main or BCECE JEE MAIN Exam that is conducted by National Testing Agency(NTA).

Earlier Undergraduate admissions were done through the Bihar Combined Entrance Competitive Examination(BCECE) conducted by Bihar Combined Entrance Competitive Examination Board, Under Bihar Combined Entrance Competitive Examination Act, 1995 of Bihar government. The Entrance examination was held in two stages: First stage was the screening test or preliminary test. The screened candidates had to appear in the main examination (second stage). Based on the merit list in the second stage, successful candidates were allotted seats in different engineering colleges of Bihar.admission can be done by jee-main

Courses 
The institute offers full-time Bachelor of Technology (B.Tech) degree programs in following disciples.

 Civil engineering
 Mechanical engineering
 Electrical engineering
 Electronics and Communication engineering
 Computer Science Engineering

References

External links 
 Official site
 BCECE Board website
 Aryabhatta Knowledge University website
 DST, Bihar website

Engineering colleges in Bihar
Educational institutions established in 2017
Colleges affiliated to Aryabhatta Knowledge University
2017 establishments in Bihar